Margeret Lurie (Hebrew: מרגרט לורי; born 22 April 1999) is an Israeli badminton player.

Achievements

BWF International Challenge/Series 
Women's doubles

  BWF International Challenge tournament
  BWF International Series tournament
  BWF Future Series tournament

References

External links 
 

1999 births
Living people
Israeli female badminton players
21st-century Israeli women